Tapeshwar Singh  is an Indian politician. He was elected to the Lok Sabha, the lower house of the Parliament of India from Bikramganj constituency in Bihar as a member of the Indian National Congress.

References

Indian National Congress politicians
Lok Sabha members from Bihar
India MPs 1980–1984
India MPs 1984–1989
Living people
Year of birth missing (living people)